Retinoid X receptor gamma (RXR-gamma), also known as NR2B3 (nuclear receptor subfamily 2, group B, member 3) is a nuclear receptor that in humans is encoded by the RXRG gene.

Function 

This gene encodes a member of the retinoid X receptor (RXR) family of nuclear receptors which are involved in mediating the antiproliferative effects of retinoic acid (RA). This receptor forms heterodimers with the retinoic acid, thyroid hormone, and vitamin D receptors, increasing both DNA binding and transcriptional function on their respective response elements. This gene is expressed at significantly lower levels in non-small cell lung cancer cells. Alternate transcriptional splice variants, encoding different isoforms, have been characterized.

See also 
 Retinoid X receptor

Interactions 

Retinoid X receptor gamma has been shown to interact with ITGB3BP.

References

Further reading 

 
 
 
 
 
 
 
 
 
 
 
 
 
 
 
 
 
 

Intracellular receptors
Transcription factors